Hidden universe or variation, may refer to:

 The Hidden Universe (1950 book) a science fiction anthology by Ralph Milne Farley
 The Hidden Universe (novella) a science fiction story by Ralph Milne Farley, originally published in Amazing Stories magazine, featured in his anthology Strange Worlds (Ralph Milne Farley collection)
 Hidden Universe 3D (film) a 2013 Australian IMAX3D documentary film about deep space

See also

 Hidden (disambiguation)
 Universe (disambiguation)
 The Hidden Reality (book) 2011 physics book by Brian Greene
 Hidden sector (physics), the hidden part of the universe
 Hidden-variable theory (physics) of the universe
 Dark universe (disambiguation)